Hubertus Castle is a 1954 German drama film directed by Helmut Weiss and starring Friedrich Domin, Marianne Koch and Heinz Baumann. It is based on the 1895 novel Hubertus Castle by Ludwig Ganghofer. The novel had previously been made into a 1934 film and was later adapted for the screen again in 1973.

It was shot at the Bavaria Studios in Munich. The film's sets were designed by Wolf Englert and Carl Ludwig Kirmse.

Cast
 Friedrich Domin  as Graf Egge
  Marianne Koch as Geislein
  Heinz Baumann as Tassilo
  Raidar Müller-Elmau as Willy
  Lil Dagover as Baronin Kleesberg
  Michael Heltau as Maler Forbeck
  Paul Richter as Jäger Honegger
 Karl Hanft  as Jäger Schipper
  Gustav Waldau as Diener Moser
  Renate Hoy as Anna Herweg
  Erika Remberg as Lieserl
  Walter Janssen as Arzt
  Georg Bauer as Patscheider
  Elisabeth Wischert as Mali
   as Bernlochner

References

Bibliography

External links

1954 films
1954 drama films
German drama films
West German films
1950s German-language films
Films based on works by Ludwig Ganghofer
Films based on German novels
Films directed by Helmut Weiss
Films about hunters
Remakes of German films
Films set in Bavaria
Films set in the Alps
Films set in castles
1950s German films
Films shot at Bavaria Studios